General Sir Charles Green, 1st Baronet (18 December 1749 – 12 July 1831) was a British Army officer who became General Officer Commanding Northern District.

Military career
Green was the son of Captain Christopher Green and was commissioned as an ensign in the 31st Regiment of Foot in 1765. He was injured and taken prisoner at the First Battle of Saratoga in September 1777 during the American Revolutionary War.

He became commanding officer of the 30th Regiment of Foot in February 1794 and was deployed to Corsica. He went on to be Civil Governor of Grenada in 1796 and then temporary commander of the British troops in the Leeward Islands in 1804. He commanded a force which captured the colony of Suriname later that year.

He became commander of the British troops in Malta in 1807, colonel of the 16th (Buckinghamshire) Regiment of Foot in 1808, General Officer Commanding Northern District in March 1812 and General Officer Commanding London District in November 1813. In 1814 he transferred as Colonel to the 37th or North Hampshire Regiment of Foot and was promoted to full General on 12 August 1819.

He had been knighted in 1803 and created a baronet in 1805. He died in 1831.

References

|-
 

|-

|-

|-

British Army generals
1749 births
1831 deaths
Governors of British Grenada
Baronets in the Baronetage of the United Kingdom
East Surrey Regiment officers
British Army personnel of the American Revolutionary War
30th Regiment of Foot officers
British Army personnel of the French Revolutionary Wars
British Army personnel of the Napoleonic Wars